Franz-Josef Laufer (born 1 September 1952) is a retired German football midfielder.

References

External links
 

1952 births
Living people
German footballers
Bundesliga players
2. Bundesliga players
VfL Bochum players
SC Westfalia Herne players
SpVgg Erkenschwick players
Association football midfielders